The Bad Boy is a lost 1917 American silent crime drama film directed by Chester Withey and starring Robert Harron, Richard Cummings, and Mildred Harris. The film marks the debut of Colleen Moore, who plays a supporting role in the film.

Plot
Small town youth Jimmie Bates (Robert Harron) is a well-intentioned, but troubled youth. Jimmie is a rowdy boy who is always getting into trouble and playing pranks on his friends and neighbors. Although deeply in love with young Mary (Mildred Harris), he eventually spurns Mary's affection for the more outgoing and worldly young Ruth (Colleen Moore).

Eventually, Jimmie's father Mr. Bates (Richard Henry Cummings), in a fit of exasperation with the boy's antics, beats him severely and Jimmie runs away from home. While on the lam Jimmie becomes involved with a criminal gang of thieves and Jimmie serves a sentence in jail. After completing his sentence, Jimmie vows to turn over a new leaf. However, the gang of thieves decide they are going to rob Jimmie's hometown bank. Jimmie tries desperately to foil the attempt during the robbery and is wounded and  arrested by the sheriff (William H. Brown) as the robbery suspect. Jimmie escapes from jail and seeks out his true love Mary who hides Jimmie at her home and nurses him back to health.

After regaining his strength, Jimmie sets about vindicating himself to his parents and townspeople. Jimmie eventually pursues and captures real perpetrator in his father's yard. After his capture, the criminal finally admits that Jimmie was not a participant in the robbery attempt and Jimmie is finally redeemed in the eyes of his family.

Cast

References
Notes

Bibliography
 Silent Star, by Colleen Moore.
 Jeff Codori (2012), Colleen Moore; A Biography of the Silent Film Star, McFarland Publishing,(Print , EBook ).

External links

The Bad Boy at silentera.com

1917 films
1917 crime drama films
American crime drama films
American silent feature films
American black-and-white films
Films directed by Chester Withey
Lost American films
Lost drama films
Triangle Film Corporation films
1917 lost films
1910s American films
Silent American drama films